USS Excel is a name used more than once by the U.S. Navy:

 , was a minesweeper launched on 10 May 1942 and decommissioned 22 January 1946
 , was a minesweeper launched on 25 September 1953 and decommissioned 30 September 1992

United States Navy ship names